William Baeuerlen was a German botanical collector and explorer. He was born in Niedernhall as Leonhard Carl Wilhelm Bäuerlen. He became Ferdinand von Mueller's botanical collector in Australia from the 1880s, and later the collector for Joseph Maiden in Sydney. 

Baeuerlen travelled extensively in eastern Australia, particularly in New South Wales, collecting many thousands of specimens. There are 4,404 records currently attributed to Baeuerlen. He was part of the Bonito Exploration of 1885 to New Guinea. In 1891 he published a book "Wildlfowers of New South Wales", co-authored by Gertrude Lovegrove. His name is honoured as specific epithets in several species. Such as Correa baeuerlenii, Eucalyptus baeuerlenii and Acacia baeuerlenii.

References

1840 births
1917 deaths
Botanical collectors active in Australia
20th-century Australian botanists
19th-century German botanists
German emigrants to Australia